Ronald Joseph Barry (27 October 1923 – 5 July 1978) was an Australian rules footballer who played with South Melbourne in the Victorian Football League (VFL).

Personal life
Barry served as a private in the Australian Army during the Second World War.

Notes

External links 

1923 births
1978 deaths
Australian rules footballers from Melbourne
Sydney Swans players
Australian Army personnel of World War II
Australian Army soldiers
People from Albert Park, Victoria
Military personnel from Melbourne